Al-Mu'ayyad Muhammad (1582 – September 1644) was an Imam of Yemen (1620–1644), son of Al-Mansur al-Qasim. He managed to expel the Ottoman Turks entirely from the Yemenite lands, thus confirming an independent Zaidi state.

Succeeding to the imamate

Muhammad was the son of Imam al-Mansur al-Qasim who restored the Zaidi imamate and began the cumbersome process of conquering back Yemen from the Ottoman occupiers. When he took the reins of government from his father in 1620, much of the highland was in Zaidi hands, and there was an uneasy truce with the Turks. In 1622 the population in and around Sa'dah in the north refused to pay taxes to the imam. Muhammad then sent his brother Saif al-Islam al-Hasan who put down the revolt. Al-Hasan, however, found means to win the confidence of the locals through reforms, and was appointed governor on behalf of the imam. Through this act of delegation of power to a relative, the power of the Qasimid family was confirmed in the north. In 1626, Muhammad conquered Jabal Fayfa east of Abu Arish. In the same year he decided to break the truce with the Ottomans after the latter had executed one of his ulemas who had gone to the Turkish-controlled San'a. The tribes of northern Yemen responded enthusiastically to his call. The sharifs of the Sulaymanid province of northern Tihamah and the amirs of Kawkaban supported Muhammad. The rising scored victories against Turkish troops. Most of the lowland area of Tihamah fell to the imam's forces, and San'a was besieged. The Ottoman difficulties were aggravated by the attacks of Shah Abbas the Great on Turkish positions in Iraq.

Expulsion of the Ottomans

In 1629 Imam al-Mu'ayyad Muhammad proposed a truce with the Ottomans, as he saw the need to rest his own forces. The governor Haydar Pasha agreed, and on 9 March 1629 he handed over the keys to San'a to the imam's son Ali. The Turks withdrew to the coast under the imam's protection, and another son, Yahya, was made governor (amil) of San'a. Yet a major city, Ta'izz, fell in the same year. In 1635 the Turks took to the offensive with an augmented force, but were defeated. Now they finally gave in, agreeing to surrender the lowland cities Zabid, and Mocha, and Kamaran Island. Thus the first period of Ottoman rule in Yemen was at an end.

Governance and personality

Al-Mu'ayyad Muhammad spent most of his reign fighting the Ottomans, as well as bringing a degree of unity among the various tribal groups of Yemen. In this work he was assisted by his able brothers al-Hasan (d. 1639), al-Husayn (d. 1640) and Ahmad (d. 1650). Ahmad was the ancestor of a line of hereditary lords of Sa'dah which sometimes opposed the authority of the imams. The imam's own son al-Qasim headed a dynastic branch that governed Shahara. Al-Mu'ayyad Muhammad was also a writer of note. Thirteen texts by his hand have been preserved, many of them legal opinions and interpretations that are based on Zaidi dogma. He declined to enforce some aspects of the shariah on society, since this could have aleniated his tribal supporters. At his death, al-Mu'ayyad Muhammad was succeeded by his brother al-Mutawakkil Isma'il, though not without fraternal strife among contenders.

See also

 Imams of Yemen
 History of Yemen
 Zaydiyyah

References

Further reading

R.L. Playfair, A History of Arabia Felix or Yemen. Bombay 1859.
Michel Tuchscherer, 'Chronologie du Yémen (1506-1635)', Chroniques yémenites 8 2000, http://cy.revues.org/11

Zaydi imams of Yemen
1582 births
1644 deaths
16th-century Arabs
17th-century Arabs